Amanda Terry (born March 7, 1975) is a Canadian makeup artist. Most notable is her work on The Kennedys for which she won an Emmy, and also her work on Beauty & the Beast and Doc. She is married to screenwriter Brandon Tataryn.

References

Canadian make-up artists
1975 births
Living people